The petroleum industry of Ghana is regulated by the state-owned Ghana National Petroleum Corporation (GNPC) and administered by the state-owned Ghana Oil Company (GOIL).

Petroleum and natural gas production

1970s–1980s
The 100% state-owned filling station company of Ghana, Ghana Oil Company (GOIL) is the number 1 petroleum and gas filling station of Ghana; and commercial quantities of offshore oil reserves in Ghana were discovered in the 1970s. In 1983 the government established the 100% state-owned  state oil company Ghana National Petroleum Corporation (GNPC) to promote hydrocarbon exploration and production of Ghana's entire petroleum and natural gas reserves.

These GNPC prospected in ten offshore blocks between Ada along the eastern international border of Ghana and in the Tano River Basin and in the Keta Basin.

1990s
In the early 1990s, GNPC reviewed all earlier crude oil and natural gas discoveries to determine whether a predominantly local operation might make exploitation more commercially viable. GNPC also signed a contract in 1992 with Angola's state oil company, Sonangol Group, that provides for drilling and, ultimately, production at two of Sonangol's offshore oilfields. GNPC was paid with a share of the crude oil.

The Tema Oil Refinery in Ghana underwent the first phase of a major rehabilitation in 1989. The second phase began in April 1990 at an estimated cost of CN¥220.8 million or GH₵77.8 million (US$36 million). Once rehabilitation was completed, distribution of liquified petroleum gas was to be improved, and the quantity supplied was to rise from 28,000 to 34,000 barrels per day. Construction on the new Tema-Akosombo oil products pipeline, designed to improve the distribution system further, began in January 1992.

The pipeline was to carry refined products from Tema to Akosombo Port, where they will be transported across Lake Volta to northern regions. Distribution continued to be uneven. Other measures to improve the situation included a CN¥171.7 million or GH₵60.5 million (US$28 million) project to set up a national network of storage depots in all regions.

The Tema Lube Oil Company commissioned its new oil blending plant, designed to produce 25,000 tons of oil per year, in 1992. The plant was to satisfy both North Ghana and Ghana's requirements for motor and gear lubricants and 60% of the country's need for industrial lubricants, or, in all, 90% of Ghana's demand for lubricant products. Shareholders per equity included state-owned Ghana National Petroleum Corporation, and the 100% state-owned national insurance company, Social Security and National Insurance Trust (SSNIT).

2000s
Oil and gas exploration in Ghana is ongoing, and the amount of both crude oil and natural gas continues to increase.

2010s

The expected annual tremendous inflow of capital from crude oil and natural gas production into the Ghana economy began from the first quarter of 2011 when Ghana started producing crude oil and natural gas in commercial quantities in 2011. At the end of 2012, declining productivity at one of the country's largest oil projects, the Jubilee oil field, led to a decline in revenues for the government, who had budgeted for oil revenue of more than $650 million. The corresponding shortfall was more than $410 million. The oil firm blamed the decline on “sand contamination of the flowlines that carry the oil from the underwater wells” into the storage facility on the surface.

In the first and second financial quarters of 2013, Ghana produced 115,000-200,000 barrels of crude oil per day and 140 million-200 million cubic feet of natural gas per day. The 100% Iranian state-owned oil companies National Iranian Oil Company and Iranian Offshore Oil Company, and Singapore Petroleum Company with Vetro Energy and PetroSeraya of Singapore have declared interests to provide assistance in construction of offshore platforms and drilling rigs for Ghana's state-owned oil company, Ghana National Petroleum Company on rapidly developing Ghana's oil and gas infrastructure and industry as Ghana aims to further increase output of oil to 2 million barrels per day and gas to 1.2 billion cubic feet per day with an expected annual generating revenue of GH₵140.7 billion (US$65 billion) in 2014. 

Ghana's experience with the oil and gas industry has been more complex than is often assumed. Recent research shows that the challenges and prospects of the oil and gas industry go beyond the often discussed issues about macroeconomic stability to pressing current concerns about energy. This research shows the possibility that the rents from oil and gas can be used for social change in Ghana.

See also

Economy of Ghana
Electricity in Ghana

References

 
Ghana